The Anti-Pinkerton Act was a law passed by the U.S. Congress in 1893 to limit the federal government's ability to hire private investigators or mercenaries.

The Anti-Pinkerton Act is contained within 5 U.S.C. 3108 and purports to specifically restrict the government of the United States (as well as that of the District of Columbia) from hiring employees of Pinkerton or similar organizations. 

The first published court case interpreting the Act, in 1977, held that the intent of the Act was in reference to Pinkerton's activities at the time, offering quasi-military armed forces for hire in the context of strikebreaking (not least the Homestead strike in 1892), "and therefore had little application" to the current organization. 

In actuality, the United States government is a significant customer of private security services, and has made use of private military contractors in the past.

Statement of the Act 
That hereafter no employee of the Pinkerton Detective Agency, or similar agency, shall be employed in any Government service or by any officer of the District of Columbia.

References 

United States federal labor legislation
Pinkerton (detective agency)
1893 in the United States
1893 in law